Colombuthurai (Kolomtara) is a suburb of the city of Jaffna in northern Sri Lanka. Colombuthurai means "the port at the bending point" in Tamil and is derived from the Tamil words kolu (plough point) and thurai (port). The suburb is divided into two village officer divisions (Colombuthurai East and Colombuthurai West) whose combined population was 3,431 at the 2012 census.

Schools
 Colombuthurai Hindu College, Jaffna

Temples
 Colombuthurai Pillayar Kovil

Notable people 
 Yogaswami, Spiritual master
 V. Yogeswaran, Politician and former Member of Parliament.
 Sarojini Yogeswaran, Former Mayor of Jaffna. 
 M.K.Eelaventhan, Politician and former Member of Parliament.
 Nishan Canagarajah, Pro-vice-chancellors of the University of Bristol, England.
 Suresh Canagarajah, Professor of Applied linguistics, English, and Asian studies at Pennsylvania State University, U.S.A.

References

Jaffna DS Division
Suburbs of Jaffna